The Department of the Rappahannock was a department of the Union Army in the Eastern Theater of the American Civil War that existed from April 4 to June 26, 1862.

On April 4, 1862, President Lincoln created the Department of the Rappahannock from the larger Department of the Potomac, detaching the I Corps from the Army of the Potomac to form the basis of the new department. Its territory consisted of Virginia “east of the Blue Ridge and west of the Potomac River, the Fredericksburg and Richmond Railroad, including the District of Columbia and the country between the Potomac and the Patuxent Rivers.” The commander of the I Corps, Irvin McDowell, was promoted to Major General and authorized to command the department.

On June 9, 1862, the department took part in its only engagement of the war, the Battle of Port Republic, during Jackson's Valley Campaign. Two brigades from the division of James Shields, commanded by Erastus B. Tyler, were outnumbered and defeated by forces led by Stonewall Jackson. The federals lost 1,002 men, while the confederates lost 816. It was Jackson’s costliest battle of the campaign, but was both a tactical and strategic victory for the confederates as it freed Jackson’s army to reinforce Robert E. Lee in the Seven Days Battles.

On June 26, 1862, the Department of the Rappahannock was merged into the Army of Virginia as the III Corps.

External links
Department of the Rappahannock

Union Army departments